Kertu Sillaste (born 24 October 1973 in Tallinn) is an Estonian textile artist, illustrator, and children's author.

She has graduated from Estonian Academy of Arts, studying textile design. Afterwards, she studied tapestry at the École supérieure des arts appliqués Duperré in Paris. Afterwards, she studied at Tallinn University (master's degree), studying art education.

In total, she has illustrated at least 16 works. She has done long-time collaboration with the children's magazine Täheke.

In 2016, she was listed in White Ravens catalogue.

Selected works
 2012: Pannkoogiraamat, Päike ja Pilv
 2015: Ei ole nii!, Päike ja Pilv
 2016: Igaüks teeb isemoodi kunsti, Päike ja Pilv
 2018: Mina olen kunstnik, Koolibri
 2019: Loomakesed läksid linna, Hea Lugu

References

Living people
1973 births
21st-century women textile artists
21st-century textile artists
21st-century Estonian women artists
21st-century Estonian women writers
Estonian women illustrators
Book designers
Estonian children's book illustrators
Estonian women children's writers
Estonian children's writers
Tallinn University alumni
Artists from Tallinn
Writers from Tallinn